In enzymology, a creatininase is an enzyme that catalyses the hydrolysis of creatinine to creatine, which can then be metabolised to urea and sarcosine by creatinase.

creatinine + H2O  creatine

Thus, the two substrates of this enzyme are creatinine and H2O, whereas its product is creatine.

Creatininase is a member of the urease-related amidohydrolases, the family of hydrolases, those acting on carbon-nitrogen bonds other than peptide bonds, specifically in cyclic amides.  The systematic name of this enzyme class is creatinine amidohydrolase. This enzyme is also called creatinine hydrolase.  This enzyme participates in arginine and proline metabolism.

Structural studies

Creatininase from Pseudomonas putida has a core structure consisting of 3-layers, alpha/beta/alpha.

References

 

EC 3.5.2
Enzymes of known structure